Stephen Naidoo, C.Ss.R. (29 October 1937 – 1 July 1989), was a South African Redemptorist and archbishop of the Roman Catholic Church. Archbishop of Cape Town from 1984 to 1989.

Biography 

Born in 1937 in Cape Town in an Indian immigrated family, Naidoo was ordained Redemptorist priest in 1961 and graduated at Pontifical University of St. Thomas Aquinas.

Consecrated auxiliary-bishop of Cape Town on 15 September 1974, he became archbishop on 20 October 1984. In 1988 he was imprisoned because of his ideas against apartheid.

He died on 1 July 1989.

References 

1937 births
1989 deaths
Roman Catholic anti-apartheid activists
20th-century Roman Catholic archbishops in South Africa
Opposition to apartheid in South Africa
Pontifical University of Saint Thomas Aquinas alumni
People from Cape Town
South African people of Indian descent
Redemptorist bishops
Roman Catholic archbishops of Cape Town